Eucharis may refer to:

Organisms
genera
 Eucharis (plant), a genus of monocotyledons
 Eucharis (wasp), type genus of the Eucharitidae family
 Eucharis (ant), a genus of ant
 a lapsus for the bee genus Epicharis
 an invalid name for the bivalve genus Basterotia
 an invalid name for the ctenophore genus Cabira
 an accepted but untenanted genus of ctenophore Eucharis (comb jelly)

species
 an invalid name for the butterfly "Hesperia eucherus" → Vettius fantasos
 the ammonite Trimarginites eucharis
 the beetle Neocolpodes eucharis
 the butterfly Delias eucharis
 the gastropod Triphora eucharis
 the velvet worm Akinothele eucharis
 the trilobite Nevadella eucharis

In the arts
 The ballet Euthyme et Eucharis, by Georges Jean Noverre, 1775
 Eucharis (fiction), a nymph from a fictional adaptation of Greek mythology
 Eucharis, a poem by Reginald F. Statham 
 "Portrait D'Eucharis", a poem by Antoine Bertin 
 A character in:
 The novel Roman Death by Joan O'Hagan, 1988 
 The German play Sappho: A Tragedy in Five Acts by Franz Grillparzer
 A Eucharis is mentioned briefly by Ennio Quirini VISCONTI, in Iconographie Grèque (1809) as being an emancipated actress performing in Greek plays at Rome during the first century AD (p.320, Vol 1). There is debate over when she lived. She died young, perhaps only 14 years old. Some lyrics and poems attest to her charm and talent.

Other uses
 Saint Walpurga, also known as Eucharis
 The asteroid 181 Eucharis